The 1990–91 Scottish Second Division was won by Stirling Albion who, along with second placed Montrose, were promoted to the First Division. Arbroath finished bottom.

Table

References 

 Scottish Football Archive

Scottish Second Division seasons
Scot
3